Semenyuk or Semeniuk is a Ukrainian surname. Notable people with the surname include:

 Andrey Semenyuk (born 1971), Belarusian diver
 Kamil Semeniuk (born 1996), Polish volleyball player
 Karolina Semeniuk-Olchawa (born 1983), Polish handball player
 Oleksandr Semenyuk (born 1987), Ukrainian footballer
 Serhiy Semenyuk (born 1991), Ukrainian footballer
 Valentyna Semenyuk-Samsonenko (1957–2014), Ukrainian politician
 Vasyl Semeniuk (born 1949), Ukrainian bishop
 Yurii Semeniuk (born 1994), Ukrainian volleyball player

See also
 
 

Ukrainian-language surnames